Patty Person Taylor House is a historic home located near Louisburg, Franklin County, North Carolina.   It was built about 1783, and is a two-story, five bay, Georgian style frame dwelling.  It has a gable roof and one-story rear extension.  It has a center-hall plan one room deep, with notable Georgian woodwork.  It was the home of the sister of Thomas Person (1733-1800), who died at the house in 1800.

It was listed on the National Register of Historic Places in 1975.

References

Houses on the National Register of Historic Places in North Carolina
Houses completed in 1783
Georgian architecture in North Carolina
Houses in Franklin County, North Carolina
National Register of Historic Places in Franklin County, North Carolina